Al-Khayriyya was a Palestinian Arab village located 7.5 kilometers east of Jaffa. It became depopulated in April 1948 as a result of a military assault by the Alexandroni Brigade of the pre-state Israeli forces during the 1948 Palestine war. The village lands would later be used by Israel as the Hiriya landfill.

History
At the time of Assyrian rule in Palestine, al-Khayriyya was known as Banai Berka and during Roman rule, it was known as by Beneberak. Late Roman and Byzantine ceramics have been found in the area. In 938/9 a sanctuary was constructed in Al-Khayriyya, on the orders of the Qadi of Damascus. During the Crusader era it was known as Bombrac, mentioned in 1191 in the Itinerarium Regis Ricardi of King Richard I of England.

Ottoman era
In 1517, the village was incorporated into the Ottoman Empire with the rest of Palestine, and in 1596 the village, called Hayriyya, appeared in the Ottoman tax registers as being in the  nahiya of Ramla (liwa´ of Gaza), with a population of 28 Muslim households, an estimated 154 persons. The villagers paid a fixed tax rate of 25% on a number of crops, including wheat, barley, fruits and sesame, as well as on other types of property, such as goats, beehives and vineyards; a total of 4,000 akçe. 

Later in the Ottoman period the village was called Ibn Ibraq, preserving the ancient name.

An Ottoman village list from about 1870 found that Jabrak had a population of 208, in 68 houses, though the population count included only men.

In 1882, the PEF's Survey of Western Palestine described the village, then named Ibn Ibrak, as "an ordinary mud village".

British Mandate era
At the time of the British Mandate for Palestine the villagers changed the name of the village to al-Khayriyya to distinguish it from the newly-established neighbouring Jewish town of Bnei Brak. The population was predominantly Muslim with twenty Christians. A school for boys was established in 1920, and it had a plot of 8 dunums of land attached to it for agricultural training. A school for girls was founded in 1945. By 1946, there were 183 boys and 69 girls in these schools.

In the 1922 census of Palestine conducted by the British Mandate authorities, Khairiyeh had a population of 546, 5 Christians and the rest Muslims. In the 1931 census the population of El Kheiriya had increased to 914, 5 Christians and the rest Muslims, in 212 houses.

The villagers worked primarily in agriculture and animal husbandry.

In the 1945 statistics the population of Al-Khayriyya was 1,420: 1,400 Muslims and 20 Christians, with 13,672 dunams of land. Of this, a total of 3,359 dunams of village land was used for citrus and bananas and 2,355 dunums for cereals, while 1,275 dunums were irrigated or used for orchards. Numerous artesian wells supplied them with irrigation water. 26 dunams were classified as built-up (urban) areas.

The Jewish settlement of Kfar Azar was established on what was traditionally village land in 1932.

1948 War and State of Israel

According to the Palestine Post, in early 1948, the village residents repeatedly attacked the nearby Ef'al settlement. The newspaper also reported that on 16 February 1948, the Haganah blew up a two-story house that was used by snipers against Ef'al.

The village of Al-Khayriyya was depopulated in the weeks leading up to the 1948 Palestine war, during the Haganah's offensive Mivtza Hametz (Operation Hametz) 28–30 April 1948. This operation was held against a group of villages east of Jaffa, including Al-Khayriyya. According to the preparatory orders, the objective was to "opening the way [for Jewish forces] to Lydda". Though there was no explicit mention of the prospective treatment of the villagers, the order spoke of "cleansing the area" [tihur hashetah]. The final operational order stated: "Civilian inhabitants of places conquered would be permitted to leave after they are searched for weapons."

During 28–30 April, the Haganah took Al-Khayriyya without a fight, the HIS attributed the non-resistance of the inhabitants to prior Arab defeats, and later added that "it is clear that the inhabitants [...] would willingly return to their villages and accept Jewish protection."

The Alexandroni Brigade 32nd Battalion reported that they found and buried the bodies of four adult men and three women in the village, and briefly detained a handful of men, women and children. Two of the adult male villagers were charged with having killed a Haganah man, and they were then promptly executed.

Following the war, the area was incorporated into the State of Israel. In 1952 and 1969 the villages of Ramat Pinkas and Ramat Ef'al, respectively, were established on village land, north of the village site. Both are now part of the suburbs of Giv'atayim.

Palestinian historian Walid Khalidi described the village remains in 1992: "A handful of houses and one of the schools remain. One deserted house, surrounded by shrubs and wild vegetation, has simple architecture: a rectangular door, small side windows, and a flat roof. A two-storey house, identified as having belonged to Ahmad al-Tibi, is used as a store. It has rectangular doors and windows and a gabled roof. Cypress, fig, Christ's-thorn, and orange trees grow on the site. Part of the adjacent land is cultivated and the rest is occupied by buildings."

The village lands were later designated for a landfill known as Hiriya.

Gallery

See also
List of towns and villages depopulated during the 1947–1949 Palestine war

References

Bibliography

Cancik, Hubert, P. Schäfer and Hermann Lichtenberger (1996), Geschichte-Tradition-Reflexion: Festschrift Für Martin Hengel Zum 70. Geburtstag. Mohr Siebeck.

External links
Welcome To al-Khayriyya
al-Khayriyya, Zochrot
Survey of Western Palestine, Map 13: IAA,  Wikimedia commons
Al-Khayriyya from the Khalil Sakakini Cultural Center

District of Jaffa
Arab villages depopulated prior to the 1948 Arab–Israeli War